Dahasak Sithuvili is a 1968 Sri Lankan film directed by G. D. L. Perera and produced by Hela Kala Pela. The film stars Henry Jayasena and Nilanthi Wijesinghe in lead roles, whereas Joe Abeywickrama, Malini Fonseka and Denawaka Hamine made supportive roles. Music was directed by Jayatissa Alahakoon. The film won several awards at local film festivals.

Cast
Henry Jayasena as Lalith
Nilanthi Wijesinghe as Nilanthi Pannawana
Joe Abeywickrama as Sunny 
Malini Fonseka as Lalith's sister  
Denawaka Hamine as Lalith's mother 
Dhamma Wanniwarachchi as Sagara
D.R. Nanayakkara as Man on bus 
Tony Ranasinghe as Music master
Ione Weerasinghe as Lila
Sumana Amarasinghe as Sagara's office receptionist
Elson Divithurugama as Party goer
Buddhi Wickrama as Lalith's co-worker
Chandra Kaluarachchi as Nilanthi's aunt

Awards
 Best Film – 2nd place at 6th Sarasaviya Awards - 1969	
 Best Editor – S.A. Nizar at 6th Sarasaviya Awards - 1969	
 Best Director – G.D.L. Perera at 6th Sarasaviya Awards - 1969	
 Special Award – Kala Pela at 6th Sarasaviya Awards - 1969	
 Best Actor – Henry Jayasena 2nd place at Vicharaka Sammana Ulela 1969	
 Best Cinematographer – D. B. Nihalsinghe 2nd place at Vicharaka Sammana Ulela 1969	
 Best Script Writer – G.D.L. Perera 2nd place at Vicharaka Sammana Ulela 1969	
 Best Story – Henry Jayasena 2nd place at Vicharaka Sammana Ulela 1969

References

External links
Sri Lanka Cinema Database
 

1968 films
1960s Sinhala-language films